Anthony Morgan may refer to:
 Sir Anthony Morgan of Kilflgin (died 1665), Royalist officer during the English Civil War
 Sir Anthony Morgan (politician) (1621–1668), fought on both sides in the English Civil War, represented parliament during the Interregnum after the Restoration an original F.R.S.
 Anthony Morgan of Marshfield and Casebuchan (1627–?), Royalist officer during the English Civil War
 Anthony Morgan of Freshwater (died 1729), English army officer, Lieutenant-Governor of the Isle of Wight, and Member of Parliament
 Anthony Morgan (American football) (born 1967), retired American football player
 Anthony Morgan (comedian), Australian comedian

See also 
 Tony Morgan (disambiguation)